1919 is a 1985 British drama film directed by Hugh Brody and written by Michael Ignatieff together with Brody. It stars Paul Scofield. It was entered into the 35th Berlin International Film Festival.  The film's title is often stylized numerically as 1919 while the film itself bears the title Nineteen Nineteen.

Cast
 Paul Scofield as Alexander Scherbatov
 Maria Schell as Sophie Rubin
 Frank Finlay as Sigmund Freud (voice)
 Diana Quick as Anna
 Clare Higgins as Young Sophie
 Colin Firth as Young Alexander
 Sandra Berkin as Nina
 Alan Tilvern as Sophie's father

References

External links

1985 films
British drama films
1980s English-language films
1985 drama films
Films directed by Hugh Brody
Works by Michael Ignatieff
1980s British films